Mauroux is a commune in the Lot department in south-western France.

In 2019 Mauroux had a population of 524. The inhabitants of Mauroux are called Maurosiens in French.

See also
Communes of the Lot department

References

Communes of Lot (department)